CommunityViz is the name of a group of extensions to ArcGIS Geographic Information System software. CommunityViz is an analysis tool used for, among other applications, urban planning, land use planning, geodesign, transportation planning and resource management applications.  It also provides options for 3D visualization in the Scenario 3D and Scenario 360 plugins. CommunityViz also allows users to export and view their work in ArcGIS Online, Google Earth and other KML/KMZ viewers such as ArcGIS Explorer. The software was originally produced by the Orton Family Foundation and in 2005 was handed off to Placeways LLC. In 2017, the software was purchased by City Explained, Inc. where its development continues.

History
CommunityViz began as an idea in the late 1990s when Noel Fritzinger and his friend Lyman Orton, proprietor of the Vermont Country Store and long-term member of his town’s local planning board, first envisioned a software tool that would make the planning process more accessible to ordinary citizens. After forming the Orton Family Foundation, they recruited a consultant team to develop the idea.  The initial team included The Environmental Simulation Center, Fore Site Consulting, PricewaterhouseCoopers, Multigen-Paradigm, and Green Mountain GeoGraphics. The first commercial version was released in late 2001 and included three components:  Scenario Constructor for interactive analysis, SiteBuilder 3D (OEMed from MultiGen-Paradigm) for 3D visualization, and Policy Simulator for agent-based modeling of future outcomes resulting from present-day policy decisions. 

By 2003 there was enough experience and research to guide a complete redevelopment that resulted in CommunityViz Version 2.  The new version was built for the new architecture of ArcGIS 8.x. It changed Scenario Constructor to Scenario 360 and gave it a new, intuitive interface. SiteBuilder 3D was updated, but Policy Simulator was dropped from the package. The new design quickly gained popularity. 

In 2005, CommunityViz development and operations were spun off from the Foundation into a new company called Placeways LLC. With continuing guidance and financial support from the Foundation, Placeways continued with new research and development, introducing Version 3 and its “decision tool” architecture in the fall of 2005, Version 4 with new 3D technology in 2009, and Version 5 with new web publishing technology in 2015, with numerous interim releases and feature upgrades on a continuing basis. In 2017, development of the software was handed off to City Explained, Inc. 

The current release of CommunityViz is Version 5.1. The software is sold using different price tiers for commercial, government/non-profit and educational users. Version 5.1 is compatible with ArcGIS 10.3, 10.4, 10.5 and 10.6.

Analysis Capabilities

In CommunityViz Scenario 360, users can create their own analyses across multiple scenarios using custom formulas, indicators, and charts which all update dynamically in real time as the user makes changes on the map or to the calculations. Because CommunityViz is an extension to ArcGIS, users can bring in GIS data and use CommunityViz while maintaining access to extensive ArcGIS Desktop and ArcGIS Online functionality. Data from other external models can be brought in as well. 

The CommunityViz dynamic analysis engine provides a versatile modeling framework.  It includes over 90 analysis functions ranging from simple arithmetic to complex geospatial calculations, and the functions themselves can be assembled into compound formulas that reference one another to create a complete model.  Model calculations typically run in real time, so that as a user experiments with edits to a map, changes to modeling inputs (called assumptions), scenarios, or alternate data inputs, results appear immediately.  Modeling results are displayed in a variety of visual forms including color-changing maps, dynamically changing charts, tables and reports, and potentially 3D visualizations.

Tools

CommunityViz contains additional analysis features including several for creating indicators, such as the 360 Indicators Wizard which can produce up to 101 indicators, the Custom Impacts Wizard to aid in designing your own indicators, and the ability to freely design as many of your own formulas and indicators as you desire. Other tools include the Land Use Designer which allows you to paint desired land uses and analyze the effects, the Build-Out Wizard which calculates the development capacity for your land, a Suitability Wizard, and TimeScope which allows you to visualize change through time. Allocator 5 and Allocator Wizard (Allocator 4) are decision tools that helps you model patterns of future growth.  It distributes a user-specified quantity of new buildings across the map according to the capacity and desirability of each land use feature. Allocation, sometimes known by the acronym LUAM (Land Use Allocation Model), is a key tool in many long-range transportation and land use planning processes.  Linking the Build-Out, Suitability and Allocator 5 tools creates a powerful and flexible urban growth modeling suite, used by cities, counties and regional governments.

Users
 
CommunityViz is used primarily for land-use planning and natural resource management, but because it allows its users to create custom analyses, it can be applied to almost any geographic decision-making process.  The largest user groups comprise government planners (local, regional, and national), private planning and design firms, and universities.  Most users are already somewhat familiar with GIS or have access to a GIS department. 

CommunityViz has been used extensively by academics and researchers. A selected list of papers and publications can be downloaded from CommunityViz Selected Publications on the City Explained website.

3D Tools
Current 3D capabilities include: 
Automatically export to Google Earth and create scenes using SketchUp models.
Create highly realistic, interactive 3D scenes using Scenario 3D with 3D models in common CAD and SketchUp formats (.KMZ, .3DS, and COLLADA interchange (.DAE)).
Works as an extension to ArcGIS ArcScene.

Awards

At the 2011 Esri Business Partners Conference, Placeways received the Extension to ArcGIS Desktop award for CommunityViz.

Book

In 2011, The Planners Guide to CommunityViz: The Essential Tool for a New Generation of Planning, by Doug Walker and Tom Daniels, was published and made available for purchase through the APA Planners Press. The book, through visuals, examples, and case studies, demonstrates CommunityViz applications across many disciplines and the many ways it can be applied including for analysis, visualization, and public participation.

Common misspellings 
"CommunityVis," "Community Viz," "communityviz," "Communitybiz" and "Communityviz" are some of the most common ways of misspelling the name. The correct spelling contains no spaces, a capital "V," and a "z."  The abbreviations "CViz" and "CV" are sometimes used.

See also
 ArcGIS - ESRI's software.

External links
 CommunityViz web site
 City Explained web site
 Orton Family Foundation web site

GIS software
ArcGIS Extension